The 2009 Sunoco Red Cross Pennsylvania 500 was a NASCAR Sprint Cup Series stock car race held on August 3, 2009, at Pocono Raceway in Long Pond, Pennsylvania. Contested over 200 laps, it was the twenty-first race of the 2009 Sprint Cup Series season. Denny Hamlin, driving for Joe Gibbs Racing, won the race.

It took three hours fifty-seven minutes to complete. Juan Pablo Montoya was humbly given a second-place finish by being .869 seconds slower than Hamlin. Eight drivers failed to finish the race; including last-place finisher Mike Wallace who parked his car on lap 13. Derrike Cope's vehicle was too slow to qualify for the race. Previous-day rain forced a competition caution on lap 22; most other yellow flags after this one were mainly for debris or accidents. Nearly 20% of the race was held under the caution flag; with a green flag run lasting an average of nearly 15 laps.

Top ten finishers

Timeline
 Start of race: Jimmie Johnson began the race in first place
 Lap 13: Mike Wallace decided to park his vehicle even though nothing was wrong with it
 Lap 17: The power steering malfunctioned in Tony Raines' vehicle
 Lap 24: David Gilliand's alternator stopped working properly
 Lap 26: Dave Blaney managed to overheat his vehicle
 Lap 30: Ignition problems forced Joe Nemechek out of the race
 Lap 36: Transmission issues caused Sterling Marlin to exit the race prematurely
 Lap 38: Patrick Carpentier's race weekend would be over due to a faulty transmission
 Lap 180: Bobby Labonte had a terminal crash; forcing him to retire from the race early
 Finish: Denny Hamlin was officially declared the winner of the event

Standings after the race

References

Sunoco Red Cross Pennsylvania 500
Sunoco Red Cross Pennsylvania 500
NASCAR races at Pocono Raceway
August 2009 sports events in the United States